Benjamin L. Starret (November 19, 1917 – January 10, 1982) was an American football back in the National Football League who played for the Pittsburgh Steelers and the Green Bay Packers.  Starret played collegiate ball for Saint Mary's College of California and played professionally in the NFL for 5 seasons.  He retired in 1945.

References

1917 births
1982 deaths
Sportspeople from Santa Rosa, California
Players of American football from California
American football running backs
Pittsburgh Steelers players
Green Bay Packers players
Wilmington Clippers players